Teresa "Baby" Jungman (9 July 1907 – 11 June 2010) was the younger daughter of Dutch-born artist Nico Wilhelm Jungmann. Along with her sister Zita, she was one of the "Bright Young Things" in the 1920s.

Biography
Jungman's father was a naturalized British subject who, in 1900, married Beatrice Mackay, from a devout Roman Catholic family in Birmingham. They were divorced in 1918, after he had been interned in Germany because of his British citizenship. Nico died in 1935. Beatrice then became the second wife of Richard Sidney Guinness (1873–1949), one of the banking Guinnesses, and a paternal uncle of Thomas "Loel" Guinness. Beatrice was killed during the Blitz.

Novelist Evelyn Waugh, himself later a Catholic convert, was greatly taken by Jungman but his affection was unrequited, in part because she was a devout Roman Catholic and he was divorced from his first wife. He met her in 1930, proposed to her in 1933, and was turned down. 
 

Jungman had many admirers during the 1920s and 1930s, including Lord Margesson, the Conservative Chief Whip; the 4th Lord Ebury (1883–1932), of the older generation; Lord David Cecil (1902–1986); “Bloggs” Baldwin (son of the Prime Minister); and the 7th Earl of Longford (then Frank Pakenham). Another admirer was the 9th Duke of Marlborough, whose second wife Gladys Deacon nearly cited Teresa in a divorce application. 

Teresa married a Scottish-Canadian sergeant-major, Graham Cuthbertson, in 1940 and had two children, Penelope and Richard. Cuthbertson soon left her; her son Richard died in a car crash in 1965; and her daughter Penelope became second wife of Desmond Guinness.

Later years and death
In later life, she lived with her elder sister Zita in reduced circumstances, until aided by a bequest from an old admirer Charlie Brocklehurst. She remained friendly with the social elite, however, and was a frequent visitor to events at which Queen Elizabeth the Queen Mother was present.

She died, aged 102, as her sister had done four years earlier in 2006, survived by her daughter, Penny Guinness.

References

External links
Telegraph obituary for Teresa Cuthbertson, 12 June 2010, p. 29. Retrieved only 4 December 2012
Last survivor of the Twenties’ Bright Young People whose antics were celebrated by Evelyn Waugh in his novel Vile Bodies
Hugo Vickers; The Jungman Sisters Part I published 17 June 2010, and The Jungman Sisters Part II 18 June 2010, on New York Social Diary.  Retrieved 4 December 2012.  Both pages contain amazing photos by Cecil Beaton, as well as Vickers's essay.

1907 births
2010 deaths
English centenarians
English people of Dutch descent
Socialites from London
Women centenarians